Dugo znamo se (trans. We Know Each Other for a Long Time) is the tenth studio album from Serbian and former Yugoslav rock band YU Grupa. It is the band's first album since the release of the album Rim 1994 in 1995.

Track listing
"Zamoliću te" (D. Jelić, P. Jelić) – 5:35
"Dugo znamo se" (D. Jelić, D. Baćino, P. Jelić) – 4:28
"Bože spasi me" (D. Jelić, Z. Đukić, P. Jelić) – 5:04
"Ima samo jedna stvar" (D. Jelić, D. Baćino, P. Jelić) – 4:47
"Tango" (D. Jelić, Z. Đukić, P. Jelić) - 5:28
"Pustinja" (D. Jelić, D. Šarić, P. Jelić) – 3:24
"Poklanjam" (D. Jelić, P. Jelić) – 4:55
"Vreme ljubav ubije" (D. Jelić, D. Baćino, P. Jelić) – 4:44
"Zašto ljubav navodi na strah" (D. Jelić, P. Jelić) – 3:44
"Poslednja pesma" (D. Jelić, D. Baćino, P. Jelić) – 3:55

Personnel
Dragi Jelić - guitar, vocals
Žika Jelić - bass guitar
Petar Jelić - guitar
Igor Malešević - drums

Guest musicians
Saša Lokner - keyboards

References 

 EX YU ROCK enciklopedija 1960-2006,  Janjatović Petar;  

YU Grupa albums
2005 albums
PGP-RTS albums